Percy-en-Normandie (literally Percy in Normandy) is a commune in the department of Manche, northwestern France. The municipality was established on 1 January 2016 by merger of the former communes of Percy and Le Chefresne.

See also 
Communes of the Manche department

References  

Communes of Manche
Populated places established in 2016
2016 establishments in France